Flimspitz (2,929 m) is a mountain of the Samnaun Alps, located on the border between Switzerland and Austria. It lies on the range between the Greitspitz and the Bürkelkopf.

From the Flimjoch a trail leads to the summit of the mountain.

References

External links
 Flimspitz on Hikr

Mountains of the Alps
Mountains of Graubünden
Mountains of Tyrol (state)
Austria–Switzerland border
International mountains of Europe
Mountains of Switzerland
Two-thousanders of Switzerland